

Teams 

The 2005–06 Segunda División was made up of the following teams:

League table

Results

Final conclusions

Promoted to La Liga
 Recreativo de Huelva
 Gimnàstic de Tarragona
 Levante UD

Promoted from Segunda División B

Relegated to Segunda División B
 UE Lleida—Relegated to Segunda División B - Group 3
 Ferrol—Relegated to Segunda División B - Group 1
 Eibar—Relegated to Segunda División B - Group 4
 Málaga B—Relegated to Segunda División B - Group 2

Relegated from La Liga
Deportivo Alavés
Cádiz CF
Málaga CF

Top scorers
Ikechukwu Uche (Recreativo) - 20 goals
José Juan Luque  (Ciudad Murcia) - 20 goals
Roberto Soldado (Real Madrid Castilla) - 19 goals
Mate Bilić (Lleida) - 18 goals
Gastón Casas (Recreativo) - 14 goals

Top goalkeepers
Roberto (Sporting Gijón) - 31 goals in 38 matches
Pablo Cavallero (Levante) - 32 goals in 37 matches
David Cobeño (Real Madrid Castilla) - 26 goals in 30 matches
Juanmi (Real Murcia) - 38 goals in 41 matches
Joaquín Valerio (Almería) - 38 goals in 39 matches

Teams by Autonomous Community

See also
List of transfers of Segunda División – 2005–06 season

 
Segunda División seasons
2
Spain